The Genius of Charlie Parker is an LP record by Charlie Parker, released posthumously by Savoy Records. All but one of tracks on this album had been previously released on other formats (78 rpm records, 7 inch EPs and 10 inch LPs), but is the first 12-inch release of these master takes. It contains selections from six sessions recorded between 1944 and 1948, and contains a previously unreleased alternate take from one these sessions.

Background
Charlie Parker recorded seven studio sessions for Savoy Records between 1944 and 1948; five as a leader, two as a sideman. Twenty-nine tracks from these sessions were released by Savoy on 78 rpm records. Twenty-seven of these tracks were reissued on 7 inch EPs and 10 inch LPs under Parker's name (the other two tracks featuring vocals by guitarist Tiny Grimes). The longer playing 12 inch LP became popular in the mid-1950s and Savoy inaugurated its 12-inch LP series with two albums (Charlie Parker Memorial, Vol. 1 [Savoy 12000] and The Immortal Charlie Parker [Savoy MG 12001]) which reissued previously released master takes along with previously unreleased alternate takes. Savoy released three more 12 inch albums (this album, Charlie Parker Memorial, Vol. 2 [Savoy MG 12009] and The Charlie Parker Story [Savoy MG 12079]) completing the reissue of the previously released master takes, and the original issue of most of the unreleased takes from these seven sessions. Parker's entire Savoy ouvre was finally issued on Charlie Parker: The Complete Savoy Studio Sessions in 1978.

The master take of "Koko", included here, is controversial in that it is unclear who, precisely, plays trumpet and\or piano on the track. The liner notes credit Miles Davis with trumpet for the session, but also credit Dizzy Gillespie with both trumpet and piano. Several sources claim Gillespie played trumpet on this track, while others deny it. Some sources claim Gillespie also played piano on this track, while others credit pianist Sadik Hakim. See the article on The Charlie Parker Story for further discussion.

The December 29, 1945 session was led by guitarist, pianist and vocalist Slim Gaillard, and was originally recorded for Bel-Tone Records in Hollywood, California, which released these tracks on 78 rpm records. When Bel-tone folded the rights to Slim Gaillard's recordings were acquired by Majestic Records which reissued these tracks, also on 78 rpm records. When Majestic folded, Savoy acquired the rights to this recording and subsequently issued the tracks on 7 inch EP and 10 inch LP records. This is the first 12-inch LP issue of these tracks.

Track list
The names of the takes are as listed in the liner notes of the album. Previously released takes are shown in boldface.

Personnel
Charlie Parker – alto saxophone
Miles Davis – trumpet (tracks A1–A7, B1–B3)
Jack McVea – tenor saxophone (tracks B4–B7)
Slim Gaillard – guitar, piano and vocals (tracks B4–B7)
Dizzy Gillespie – piano (tracks B1 and B3) and trumpet (tracks B1, B4–B7)
Sadik Hakim – piano (track B1)
Dodo Marmarosa – piano (tracks B4–B7)
Bud Powell – piano (tracks A6–A7)
Duke Jordan – piano (tracks A1–A3)
John Lewis – piano (tracks A4–A5, B2)
Curley Russell – double bass (tracks A4–A5, B1–B3)
Bam Brown – double bass (tracks B4–B7)
Tommy Potter – double bass (tracks A1–A3, A6–A7)
Max Roach – drums (tracks A1–A7, B1–B3)
Zutty Singleton – drums (tracks B4–B7)

Notes

References

1956 albums
Charlie Parker albums
Savoy Records albums
Albums produced by Teddy Reig